The William G. and Anne Williams House is a historic building in Sparta, Wisconsin and was a four-room bed and breakfast.

The Williams house is a Queen Anne style Victorian home that is on the Wisconsin State and National Register of Historic Places since 2005.  The home is known officially on the historical register as the Williams, William G. and Anne, House.  The home was built by, W. G. Williams, a banker in the small town. Today the home is a Private Resident for Mr. Elliott and Mr. Mueller.

References

External links
Franklin Victorian Bed & Breakfast
Wisconsin State Register
Destination Nexus

Houses on the National Register of Historic Places in Wisconsin
Queen Anne architecture in Wisconsin
Houses completed in 1900
Houses in Monroe County, Wisconsin
National Register of Historic Places in Monroe County, Wisconsin